The Pact of Madrid, signed on 23 September 1953 by Francoist Spain and the United States, was a significant effort to break the international isolation of Spain after World War II, together with the Concordat of 1953. This development came at a time when other victorious Allies of World War II and much of the rest of the world remained hostile (for the 1946 United Nations condemnation of the Francoist regime, see Spanish Question) to a fascist regime sympathetic to the cause of the Axis powers and established with the Axis assistance. The 1953 accord took the form of three separate executive agreements that pledged the United States to furnish economic and military aid to Spain. The United States, in turn, was to be permitted to construct and to utilize air and naval bases on Spanish territory (Naval Station Rota, Morón Air Base, Torrejón Air Base and Zaragoza Air Base).

Although not a full-fledged military alliance, the pact did result in a substantial United States contribution to the improvement of Spain's defense capabilities. During the initial United States fiscal years 1954 to 1961 phase, military aid amounted to US$500 million, in the form of grants. Between 1962 and 1982, a further US$1.238 billion of aid in the form of loans (US$727 million) and grants (US$511 million) was provided. During the period 1983 to 1986, United States military aid, entirely in the form of sales under concessional credit terms, averaged US$400 million annually, but it declined to slightly more than US$100 million annually in 1987 and in 1988. The military credits were scheduled to be phased out in the fiscal year 1989, in keeping with Spain's growing self-sufficiency in national defense. More than 200 officers and NCOs of the Spanish Armed Forces received specialized training in the United States each year under a parallel program.

See also
 Spain–United States relations
 United States Air Forces in Europe
 1966 Palomares B-52 crash

References

20th century in Spain
Spain–United States relations
Treaties concluded in 1953
Treaties entered into force in 1953
Treaties of the United States
Treaties of Francoist Spain
1953 in Spain
1953 in the United States